The Sharda River, also called Kali River and Mahakali River, originates at Kalapani in the Himalayas at an elevation of  in the Pithoragarh district in Uttarakhand, India. It joins Ghaghra River, a tributary of the Ganges. It takes the name Kali River from the union of the two streams at Gunji as it flows through the hills. After Brahmadev Mandi near Tanakpur, it enters the Terai plains, where it is called Sharda River.

It offers potential for hydroelectric power generation. The river is also proposed as source for one of the many projects in the Himalayan component of the Indian Rivers Inter-link project.

Etymology and naming 
It is named after Śāradā, which is another name for Saraswati, the goddess of learning.

Hydrology

Sources of river

The sources of the Sharda river have seen much debate through history. The tradition believes that the river originates from a collection of springs near the Kalapani village. The Almora District Gazetteer states:

In the British definition of 1911, the Sharda River is formed by the union of two headwaters: the Kalapani River that originates below the Lipulekh Pass and the Kuthi Yankti river that rises below the Limpiyadhura range. But both the streams have been termed "Kali River" on different occasions.

The Sharda River serves as the boundary between Uttarakhand's Kumaon Division and Nepal from "a little below the Kalapani encamping ground". The Lipulekh pass as well as the Limpayadhura pass (or Limpiya pass) are on Uttarakhand's border with Tibet.

Course

The Sharda River receives from the right, the Darma River at Tawaghat. It passes Dharchula and receives Gori Ganga at Jauljibi, after which it exists the high mountains that reach into the alpine zone. At   the first important left-bank (L) tributary from Nepal, the Chameliya  joins after flowing southwest from Nepal's Gurans Himal (including Api). A bazaar town Jhulaghat is on both sides of the river. The area around Pancheshwar is called Kali Kumaon.

Then it enters the lower Shivalik Hills. Here water is diverted into an irrigation canal. Finally, the river exits the last hills into the Terai plains, passing the towns Banbasa (R) and Mahendranagar (Bhim Datta) (L). NNW of Bahraich.

Basin 

In Nepal, the Sharda River lies entirely in the Sudurpashchim Province of Nepal and in the Mahakali Zone which has four administrative districts – Baitadi District with Baitadi as its headquarters, Dadeldhura District with Dadeldhura as its headquarters, Darchula District with Darchula as its headquarters and Kanchanpur District with Mahendranagar as its headquarters.

In India it lies along the Kumaon division of Uttarakhand state, Pithoragarh district, Champawat district and part of Udham Singh Nagar district fall under the Sharda basin. No large tributary joins the Sharda between Upper Sharda and Lower Sharda barrages in India. In Uttar Pradesh, part of Lakhimpur Kheri district is also under the Sharda basin.

Mahakali (Sharda in India) is one of the five major river basins of Nepal which is shared with India and has a total basin area of 14871 km up to Upper Sharda Barrage, about 34 per cent of which lies in Nepal. The total catchment area is 17,818 km up to Lower Sharda Barrage.

Development and resource utilisation

Mahakali Treaty 

The Treaty on Integrated Development of Mahakali River was signed by the Prime Minister of His Majesty's Government of Nepal and the Prime Minister of the Government of India in February 1996 and which came into effect in June 1997. It concerns with the Integrated Development of the Mahakali (Sharda in India) River including Sharda Barrage (existing), Tanakpur Barrage (existing) and Pancheshwar Project (Proposed – under Planning). Pancheshwar Multipurpose Project (PMP) on the river Mahakali is the centerpiece of the Treaty.

The Treaty has 12 Articles with a preamble. As per the Treaty principles both sides are committed to design and operate the project as a single, integrated scheme to yield, "the maximum total net benefits accruing to them". The power benefit is to be assessed on the basis of saving in costs as compared with the relevant alternatives available. As per the Treaty "equal entitlement in the utilisation of the waters of the Mahakali River "without prejudice to their respective existing consumptive uses" is also planned to be ensured from the PMP.

The concluding Article 12 states as under:
 Following the conclusion of this Treaty, the earlier understandings reached between the parties concerning the utilisation of the waters of the Mahakali River from the Sharda Barrage and the Tanakpur Barrage, which have been incorporated herein, shall be deemed to have been replaced by this Treaty.
 This Treaty shall be subject to ratification and shall enter into force on the date of exchange of instruments of ratification. It shall remain valid for a period of seventy-five (75) years from the date of its entry into force.
 This Treaty shall be reviewed by both the parties at ten (10) years interval or earlier as required by either party and make amendments thereto, if necessary.
 Agreements, as required, shall be entered into by the parties to give effect to the provisions of this Treaty.

As per a submission by the DDP Secretariat of the United Nations Environment Programme (UNEP) on Dams and Development Project, on the Mahakali Treaty it is stated that "the Treaty emphasizes an integrated approach to the development of water resources and, more importantly, attempts to validate past activities taken to develop water resources on the Mahakali River." UNEP has in conclusion observed that "the signing of the Mahakali Treaty has indeed provided India and Nepal with an opportunity for meaningful cooperation to benefit the millions of people in the two countries whose livelihood depends on the waters of the Mahakali River."

Dams 
The Pancheshwar Dam, a joint venture of India and Nepal for irrigation and hydro-electric power generation was proposed on this river, in 1995, named as Sarayu or Kali River. However, Nepal and India have been unable to reach a decision on the 5,600-MW Pancheshwar multipurpose dam project, in part because of political changes both in Nepal and India. The project became a priority again in 2013, and negotiations restarted.

The Tanakpur Hydroelectric Project (120MW) was commissioned in April 1993 by the NHPC, with a barrage on the Sharda River near the town of Tanakpur in the district of Champawat.

Irrigation

Sharda Barrage (Upper Sharda Barrage) Irrigation Project 
The Sharda Barrage on the Sharda River (Mahakali River), the first irrigation project on the river, was built in the 1920s under an Agreement signed between British India and Nepal (Sharda Agreement Letters of Exchange dated 23 August 1920 and 12 October 1920) to exchange 4000 acres (for a compensation of Rs 50,000 to Nepal) of the eastern flank of West Nepal. It still regulates the diversion of the (Sharda) Mahakali River exclusively for the purpose of irrigation and power in Uttar Pradesh in India. Before 1920 the Mahakali was a border river with the left bank in Nepal and the right bank in India. The Sharda Agreement of 1920-transferred ownership of part of the left bank area (in the vicinity of the Barrage) from Nepal to India and the Sharda Barrage belongs to India. This agreement has been subsumed in the Mahakali Treaty signed in February 1996 (referred above) and ratified on 27 November 1996. which entails the following supply from the Sharda Barrage to Nepal.

Although the Sharda Agreement was made in 1920, Nepal could utilise her share of the water only after the construction of the Mahakali Irrigation Project in 1975.

Water is diverted from the Barrage to the Sharda Right Bank Canal, (with a capacity of about 396 m³/s) (2), for irrigation in India. In addition to the irrigation facilities, India also generates hydropower with an installed capacity of 41 MW from the canal head power station. An extensive effort for developing irrigation potential and for the maintenance of the canal with its branches, feeders, tributaries, channels and drain was undertaken by Engineer Abinash Chandra Chaturvedi during 1961–65 in Sitapur District of Uttar Pradesh. It has since served as a model scheme for irrigation engineers.

Lower Sharda Barrage 

The Lower Sharda Barrage is constructed on the Sharda River, about 163.5 km downstream of the Upper Sharda Barrage, and nearly 28 km from Lakhimpur city.

This project is part of the Sharda Sahayak Pariyojana (SSP) and primarily depends on water diverted from the Karnali (Ghaghra) at Girjapur through the Sharda Sahayak link canal of 28.4 km length for over eight months in the year during the lean season; but it indents on Sharda supplies during the monsoon between July and October when the Karnali carries a lot of silt.

The SSP aims at irrigating culturable command area (CCA) of 16,770 km2 with 70 per cent irrigation intensity. The 258.80 km long feeder channel of SSP takes off from the right bank of Sharda Barrage with discharge of 650 m3/s. Supplies are then fed into the different branches of the Sharda canal system, namely, the Daryabad branch, the Barabanki branch, the Haidergarh branch, the Rae Bareli branch and the Purva branch.

SSP provides protective canal irrigation for cultivable area of 2 m ha to lakhs of farmers in 150 development blocks of 16 districts in eastern Uttar Pradesh. The project was commissioned in 1974, and completed in 2000 with an estimated cost of Rs. 13 billion.

Hydropower 
In Nepal, Karnali and Mahakali rivers together have hydropower potential of 36,180 MW (economically exploitable is 25,000 MW) out of a total potential of 83,000 MW.

In the Indian state of Uttarakhand, which adjoins the Sharda (Mahakali river), the power generation envisaged is likely to be 6400 MW at 60% load factor (about 24,000 MW at 16% load factor) out of which 2400 MW (9000 MW at 16% load factor) is from the right bank tributaries of the Sharda (Mahakali), excluding the Pancheshwar Multipurpose Project.

Some of the projects built/under construction/planned are as under.

Tanakpur Barrage and Hydroelectric Project 
Tanakpur HEP is a run of the river scheme on the Sharda River (Mahakali River in Nepal) located near the town of Tanakpur in the district of Champawat. It has a Barrage across the Sharda River for diverting river flows into a 6.2 km long power channel of 566 m³/s capacity for utilisation of 24 m head available between the Barrage at Tanakpur and the existing Sharda canal i.e. 0.6 km down stream of Banbasa Barrage. The power station with 3 units of 40 MW (3x40 MW=120 MW) is located near the existing Banbasa Barrage. The tail race channel joins directly the Sharda River. The project is designed to produce 460 million units of power on 90% availability. The construction of the Barrage was started in 1988. In the spirit of furthering co-operation within the Mahakali River area, the Governments of India and Nepal entered into a Memorandum of Understanding (MOU), commonly referred to as the Tanakpur Agreement, on 6 December 1991. The Agreement provided for the construction of the left afflux bund (the retaining wall) on Nepalese territory for which the Nepalese provided 2.9 hectares of land to construct the left afflux bund of 577 m length. India was also required to provide 10 million kWh of power to Nepal with, free of charge. 
The Tanakpur Project was commissioned in April 1993. But the seething discontent entrenched for nearly five years in Nepal on benefits agreed to be provided by India to Nepal under the agreement of 1991 continued till the Mahakali Treaty between the two countries for the integrated development of water resources on the Mahakali River was signed on 12 February 1996. The Mahakali Treaty has subsumed the regime established by the Sharda Treaty, has validated the controversial Tanakpur Agreement, and endorsed the idea of a new multipurpose project – The Pancheshwar Multipurpose Project (PMP) – the details of which, are being worked out. As per the Treaty, Nepal is now entitled to an annual supply of 70 million kWh of power from Tanakpur HEP on a continuous basis, free of cost, from the effective date of the Mahakali Treaty. For this purpose, India also agreed to construct a 132 kV transmission line all the way to the Indo-Nepalese border from the Tanakpur Power Station. India has also agreed to construct a road linking Tanakpur to Nepal's East–West highway.

Pancheshwar Multipurpose Project (PMP) & Purnagiri Re-regulating Dam (Indo–Nepal) 
In compliance of the Treaty provisions mentioned above, the scope of Pancheshwar Multipurpose Project (PMP) is being actively discussed and defined by Nepal and India to enable finalisation of the Detailed Project Report. The proposed project, which straddles the border that lies along the median point of the river, envisages a 293 m high rock fill dam (to be the largest rock fill dam in the world), just downstream of the confluence of the Mahakali and Sarju river, having a live storage capacity of 9.24 BCM and a dead storage capacity of 2.15 BCM. In the project area, the river forms the border between India and Nepal, dividing the Sudurpashchim Province province of Nepal from the Uttarakhand State in India. The PMP also envisages a re-regulating dam for which two alternatives at Purnagiri (1020 MW) and Rupaligad (500 MW) have been considered, to hold the waters passing through the turbines and provide regulated back season release to irrigate designated commands in Nepal and India. Two power stations are projected, one on either bank, with an overall installed peaking capacity, between 5,500 and 6,480 MW at 20 per cent load factor. As per the Treaty principles both sides are committed to design and operate the project as a single, integrated scheme to yield, "the maximum total net benefits accruing to them". The power benefit is to be assessed on the basis of saving in costs as compared with the relevant alternatives available. As per the Treaty "equal entitlement in the utilisation of the waters of the Mahakali River "without prejudice to their respective existing consumptive uses" is also planned to be ensured from the PMP.

Chameliya Hydroelectric Project 
Chameliya Hydroelectric Project, in Nepal (in the Far Western Development Region), a daily peaking run-off-river (PROR) scheme with an installed capacity of 30 MW, has been taken up for construction during January 2007. The Project lies about 950 km west of Kathmandu on Chameliya river, a tributary of Mahakali river in Darchula district. The Main features of the Project are 54 m high concrete dam, 4.06 km long headrace tunnel, surge tank, penstocks and semi- underground powerhouse with two units of each 15.3 MW vertical shaft Francis turbines. The generated power from the Project will be evacuated through 131 km long 132 kV transmission line, connecting Attariya Substation at Kailali district.

Tourism

National parks in the basin 
Notable national parks are Shuklaphanta National Park in Nepal and Dudhwa National Park in India.
The protected area supports a wide range of nationally and globally important biodiversity, including 46 mammal species.
It has a common boundary with the Indian state of Uttar Pradesh in the south and west which is formed by the Mahakali River, and is bordered on the east by the Chaudhar River and in the north by a forest belt and cultivations. The prevalent vegetation is grassland. Forest stands comprise sal, khair and sissoo. This protected area hosts the worldwide largest herd of swamp deer, and 423 bird species including the largest population of Bengal florican.

Dudhwa National Park is located in Uttar Pradesh, India. The northern edge of the park lies along the India-Nepal border, and the southern boundary is formed by the Suheli River. The terrain of the park varies from mosaic grasslands, dense sal forests and swampy marshes. It has diverse wildlife population. In 1987 Dudhwa National Park and Kishanpur Wildlife Sanctuary were merged to form Dudhwa Tiger Reserve. Although the tigers at the park are numerous, sightings are rare due to the thick forest cover of the area. Besides tigers, leopards, hispid hares, swamp deer and Indian rhinoceros, it harbours 400 species of resident and migratory birds, 37 species of mammals and 16 species of reptiles.

Water rafting in Kumaon region of Uttarakhand 

As the river flows down from the Nepal border through Kumaon hills and as the Kali and Gori Rivers meet at Jauljibi, with increased water volume, it offers great river rafting adventure to professionals, for a length of 117 km, from Jauljibi to Tanakpur. In rafting parlance, in this stretch, the rapids in the river are of Grade IV and more, which could be covered in 3 days. Below Tanakpur, Lower down among the frosted slopes, the river becomes calmer offering the amateur a sporting challenge.

Places of religious interest 

Both sides of the Mahakali valley, the Indian and the Nepali, are rich in sacred natural sites. These include certain bugyals (high-altitude pastures) that are considered sacred, sacred forests and water bodies, and sacred mountains. Some famous sacred mountains in this region include Adi Kailash, Om Parvat, and Gwalek Kedar. 

In the Kumaon region of Uttarakhand in India every peak, lake or mountain range is somehow or the other connected with some myth or the name of a God or Goddess, ranging from those associated with the Shaiva, Shakta and Vaishnava traditions, to local Gods like Haim, Saim, Golu, Nanda, Sunanda, Chhurmal, Kail Bisht, Bholanath, Gangnath, Airi and Chaumu. Referring to the rich religious myths and lores associated with Uttarakhand, E. T. Atkinson has said: 'To the beliefs of the great majority of Hindus, the Kumaon (Himalaya) is what Palestine is to the Christians.'

In Kumaon, famous temples are the Kali temple at Kalapani, Shiva temple of Singhphal in Dudhwa reserve, the Baleshwar temple (in South Indian architectural style) at Champawat , an Indian National Heritage Monument of Archaeological Survey of India (ASI) since 1952, and Nagnath temple in Champawat

Issues

Human and fish conflict 

The river attracted media attention in 2007, over the Kali river goonch attacks that cost three lives, probably by an exceptionally large catfish of the Bagarius yarrelli species. Efforts to capture the offending fish were shown in episodes of a documentary television program River Monsters.

See also 
 Indo-Gangetic Plain

References

External links 

International rivers of Asia
Rivers of Sudurpashchim Province
Border rivers
Rivers of Uttar Pradesh
Rivers of Uttarakhand
India–Nepal border
Geography of Lakhimpur Kheri district
Pilibhit
Tourist attractions in Lakhimpur Kheri district
Rivers of India

sv:Kali (flod)